Vinícius Faria dos Santos (born 15 November 1999), known as Vinícius dos Santos, is a Brazilian footballer who currently plays as a midfielder for Japanese side Suzuka Point Getters, on loan from Nacional-SP.

Career statistics

Club

Notes

References

External links

1999 births
Living people
Brazilian footballers
Association football forwards
CR Flamengo footballers
Nacional Atlético Clube (SP) players
Maringá Futebol Clube players
FC Ryukyu players
Suzuka Point Getters players
Japan Football League players
Brazilian expatriate footballers
Brazilian expatriate sportspeople in Japan
Expatriate footballers in Japan
People from Ferraz de Vasconcelos